Norma Duffield Stong "Duffy" Lyon (July 29, 1929 – June 26, 2011) was an American farmer and artist nicknamed The Butter Cow Lady. She was known for creating elaborate butter sculptures at the Iowa State Fair from 1960 until 2006, when she retired. She also produced sculptures on commission for politicians and celebrities, as well as for other state fairs.

Early years
Lyon was born in Nashville, Tennessee on July 29, 1929, the daughter of Benton J. Stong, a newspaper reporter, and his wife, Elsa. Her grandmother, Bertha Clark, was a founder of the Knoxville Symphony Orchestra, and her uncle, Phil Stong, wrote the book State Fair, which was later made into three movies and a stage musical.

She studied animal science at Iowa State University, because they did not allow women in their Veterinary Sciences program at the time. There she trained in sculpture with artist Christian Petersen.

Family
She married Gaylord "Joe" Lyon on July 22, 1950 in Ames, Iowa, and they moved to Toledo, Iowa, to run their dairy farm, Lyon Jerseys. The couple had nine children.

Career
In 1960, she took over the Iowa State Fair butter cow creation, a tradition since 1911. She later expanded to creating other sculptures, including Garth Brooks, Elvis Presley, John Wayne, Peanuts characters, a Harley-Davidson motorcycle, American Gothic by Grant Wood and the Last Supper. She also made busts of Katie Couric, Matt Lauer, Barack Obama and a cheese bust of David Letterman.

Lyon appeared on To Tell the Truth in 1963, and was correctly identified as the Butter Cow Lady by  two of the panelists, Kitty Carlisle and Tom Poston. She later appeared on Late Night with David Letterman with a cow carved from cheese. She was the subject of a 2002 book, The Butter Cow Lady, written by Brenda Mickle.

Death
On June 26, 2011, she died of a stroke in Marshalltown, Iowa, age 81. She was survived by a large extended family, including her husband, nine children, 23 grandchildren, and five great-grandchildren.

References

 ↑ 
 1 2 3 
 ↑ Longden, Tom (December 25, 2004). Lyon, 'Duffy'. Des Moines Register
 1 2 
 ↑ 
 ↑ Huffstutter, P.J. (June 27, 2011). "Norma 'Duffy' Lyon, queen of the butter cow sculptors, dies at 81." Los Angeles Times
 1 2 
 ↑ 
 ↑ 
 ↑ Lyon, Valerie (September 24, 2020). “The Butter Cow Lady’s Christmas: Recipes and Recollections of a Duffy Lyon Christmas” Amazon POD. 
 ↑ Acker, Duane (January 12, 2018). “From Troublesome Creek” Booktopia.  p. 39

External links
Lyon Jerseys family site  

Lyon Jerseys via American Jersey Cattle Association
The Butter Cow Lady’s Christmas: Recipes and Recollections of a Duffy Lyon Christmas 
Iowa State University Lyon Fund via Iowa State University (ISU)

1929 births
2011 deaths
People from Nashville, Tennessee
People from Marshall County, Iowa
Farmers from Iowa
Butter
Sculptors from Tennessee
Sculptors from Iowa
Iowa State University alumni
People from Ames, Iowa
People from Toledo, Iowa
American women farmers
21st-century American women